Oligostachyum is a genus of bamboo in the grass family, native to coastal China.

The genus is sometimes considered a synonym of Arundinaria.

Species

Formerly included
see Pseudosasa 
 Oligostachyum orthotropoides – Pseudosasa hindsii 
 Oligostachyum pulchellum – Pseudosasa cantorii

References

Bambusoideae
Bambusoideae genera
Endemic flora of China
Grasses of China